Jean-Philippe Bergeron may refer to:
 Jean-Philippe Bergeron (writer)
 Jean-Philippe Bergeron (racing driver)